The Khazar Lankaran 2007–08 season was Khazar Lankaran's third Azerbaijan Premier League season. It was their second season under the management of Agaselim Mirjavadov. They finished 4th in the league and won the Azerbaijan Cup in extra-time against Inter Baku.

Squad

Transfers

Summer

In:

Out:

Winter

In:

 

Out:

Competitions

Azerbaijan Premier League

Results

Table

Azerbaijan Cup

Final

Source: Cup Results

CIS Cup

Group stage

Knockout stage

UEFA Champions League

Qualifying rounds

Squad statistics

Appearances and goals

|-
|colspan="14"|Players who appeared for Khazar Lankaran who left on loan during the season:

|-
|colspan="14"|Players who appeared for Khazar Lankaran who left during the season:

|}

Goal scorers

Notes
Qarabağ have played their home games at the Tofiq Bahramov Stadium since 1993 due to the ongoing situation in Quzanlı.

References

External links 
 Khazar Lankaran at Soccerway.com

Khazar Lankaran FK seasons
Khazar Lankaran